The AFW was manufactured in Germany between 1923 and 1925, and used a 246cc overhead valve engine supplied by Hansa Prazisionwerke AG of Bielefeld.

References

Motorcycle manufacturers of Germany